Jonathan Beaumont is an author of a number of books on Irish interest. He also works as a tour guide.

Rails to Achill (2001) describes the history of the Westport to Achill railway, which ran from 1894 to 1937.Achillbeg: The Life of an Island (2005) chronicles life on the island of Achillbeg, which was depopulated in 1965. Research for the latter book  was funded by the Community Foundation for Northern Ireland.

Publications 
 
 
 Beaumont, Jonathan & Carse, Barry:  Rails Through the West (Colourpoint Press, 2012)
 Beaumont, Jonathan & Carse, Barry:  Rails Through North Kerry (Colourpoint Press, 2016)

References 

Year of birth missing (living people)
Living people
Irish writers
Writers from Belfast
21st-century writers from Northern Ireland
Male non-fiction writers from Northern Ireland